Play On may refer to:
Play On (horse), an American Thoroughbred racehorse
Play On (John Miles album), a 1983 album by John Miles
Play On (Carrie Underwood album), a 2009 album by Carrie Underwood
Play On, a track from the album A World Next Door to Yours by The Parlotones
Play On, a track from the album Do You Want the Truth or Something Beautiful? by Paloma Faith
Play On!, a Broadway Musical based on the music of Duke Ellington.
PlayOn, a PC-based browser and media server.